Champagnat Catholic School is a private Catholic school with a campus in Hialeah, Florida, United States. Established in 1968, the school currently serves students in sixth through twelfth grades.

History 
Champagnat Catholic School was founded by Dr. Reinaldo and Mrs. Maria I. Alonso at a time in the history of Miami when there was a need to serve immigrant families moving to Miami. Champagnat came in to strengthen the religious, the civic and patriotic roots of children coming in from Cuba and Central and South America.

Champagnat Catholic School started under the auspices of the Marist Brothers due to Dr. Alonso's previous years as principal of the Champagnat elementary in La Vibora, Cuba and later on the Champagnat high school in Cienfuegos, Cuba. The first Champagnat Catholic School opened its classroom doors on September 8, 1968, at the corner of 29th Avenue and 7th Street SW in Miami with 123 students. In 1973 the school opened the doors to a second campus in Hialeah.

The school is accredited by the National Independent Private Schools Association (NIPSA), National Council of Private Schools Association (NCPSA), Council of Bilingual Schools (COBIS).

There are also some other educative schools called "Champagnat". One of the biggest is based in Buenos Aires, Argentina.

Campus 
Champagnat Catholic School currently has a campus in Hialeah at 1851 Palm Avenue serving sixth through twelfth grades.

Curriculum 

Curriculum follows Florida State Standards with an emphasis on preparing for entry to universities/colleges. Students are required to take English Language Arts, Literature, Mathematics, Science, Social Studies, Foreign Language and PE each school year. Electives currently include Intro to Business Management, Marketing Essentials, Hospitality and Tourism, Forensic Science, Sports and Entertainment Management, and World Religions. In order to enhance the educational experience all high school students are on a 1:1 iPad digital curriculum and have access to virtual courses via FLVS.

Extracurricular activities 

Student Council, Athletics

Notable alumni 
 Luis Exposito, former MLB player for the Baltimore Orioles
 Fernando Isern, current bishop of the Diocese of Pueblo
 Alex Penelas, Mayor of Miami-Dade County, Florida 1996-2004
Gregory Rousseau, current NFL player for the Buffalo Bills

References

External links 
 

Educational institutions established in 1968
Private schools in Miami-Dade County, Florida
Private high schools in Florida
Education in Hialeah, Florida
Education in Miami
Private middle schools in Florida
Private elementary schools in Florida